Ruslan Khamitovich Makhmutov (born 27 January 1991) is a Russian professional footballer. He plays for FC Volga Ulyanovsk.

Career
He made his professional debut in the Russian Second Division in 2008 for FC Togliatti.

Makhmutov made his debut for the main squad of Rubin Kazan on 13 July 2010 in the Russian Cup game against FC Volgar-Gazprom Astrakhan.

He made his Russian Football National League debut for FC Neftekhimik Nizhnekamsk on 10 July 2012 in a game against FC Metallurg-Kuzbass Novokuznetsk.

References

External links
 

1991 births
Sportspeople from Tolyatti
Living people
Russian footballers
Russia youth international footballers
Association football midfielders
FC Dynamo Moscow reserves players
FC Tolyatti players
FC Rubin Kazan players
FC Neftekhimik Nizhnekamsk players
FC Lada-Tolyatti players
FC Chayka Peschanokopskoye players
FC Zenit-Izhevsk players
FC Volga Ulyanovsk players
Russian First League players
Russian Second League players